John William Higson (third ¼ 1887 – fourth ¼ 1958) was an English professional rugby league footballer who played in the 1900s, 1910s and 1920s. He played at representative level for Great Britain and England, and at club level for Featherstone Rovers (Heritage № 17) (two spells, pre & post-Northern Union), Hunslet, Huddersfield and Wakefield Trinity (Heritage № 321), as a forward (prior to the specialist positions of), during the era of contested scrums.

Background
John Higson's birth was registered in Pontefract district, West Riding of Yorkshire, England, and his death aged 74 was registered in Wakefield district, West Riding of Yorkshire, England.

Playing career

International honours
John Higson won caps for England while at Hunslet in 1908 against Wales, and in 1909 against Australia (two matches), and won caps for Great Britain while at Hunslet in 1908 against Australia, and in 1909 against Australia.

Challenge Cup Final appearances
John Higson played as a forward, i.e. number 12, in Hunslet's 14–0 victory over Hull F.C. in the 1908 Challenge Cup Final during the 1907–08 season at Fartown Ground, Huddersfield on Saturday 25 April 1908, in front of a crowd of 18,000.

County Cup Final appearances
John Higson played as a forward, i.e. number 13, in Hunslet's 17–0 victory over Halifax in the 1907 Yorkshire County Cup Final during the 1907–08 season at Headingley Rugby Stadium, Leeds on Saturday 21 December 1907, played and scored a try in Huddersfield's 22–10 victory over Hull Kingston Rovers in the 1911 Yorkshire County Cup Final during the 1911–12 season at Belle Vue, Wakefield on Saturday 25 November 1911, and played as a forward, i.e. number 11, in Wakefield Trinity's 3–10 defeat by Huddersfield in the 1926 Yorkshire County Cup Final during the 1926–27 season at Headingley Rugby Stadium, Leeds on Wednesday 1 December 1926, the original match on Saturday 27 November 1926 was postponed due to fog.

All Four Cups, and "The Terrible Six"
John Higson was a member of Hunslet's 1907–08 season All Four Cups winning team, the Forwards were known as "The Terrible Six" they were; Tom Walsh, Harry Wilson, Jack Randall, Bill "Tubby" Brookes, Bill Jukes, and John Willie Higson, he was also a member of Huddersfield's 1914–15 All Four Cups winning "Team of All Talents", and consequently is the only player to win All Four Cups on two occasions.

Club career
John Higson played for Featherstone Rovers before they joined the Northern Union, he was transferred from Featherstone Rovers to Hunslet in 1905, he was transferred from Huddersfield, and rejoined Featherstone Rovers in 1921 playing alongside; Ernest Barraclough and Billy Clements, he made his début for Featherstone Rovers in the Northern Union on Saturday 17 September 1921, he played his last match for Featherstone Rovers in the 29–16 victory over York at Post Office Road, Featherstone on Saturday 25 April 1925. he made his début for Wakefield Trinity during October 1925.

Testimonial match
John Higson's benefit season/testimonial match at Featherstone Rovers took place during the 1921–22 season.

Genealogical information
John Higson was the father of the rugby league footballer; Leonard Higson.

References

External links
Huddersfield – All Four Cups
1907–08 – Hunslet's Greatest Season

1887 births
1958 deaths
England national rugby league team players
English rugby league players
Featherstone Rovers players
Great Britain national rugby league team players
Huddersfield Giants players
Hunslet F.C. (1883) players
Rugby league forwards
Rugby league players from Pontefract
Wakefield Trinity players